American Typewriter is a slab serif typeface created in 1974 by Joel Kaden and Tony Stan for International Typeface Corporation. It is based on the slab serif style of typewriters; however, unlike most true typewriter fonts, it is a proportional design: the characters do not all have the same width. American Typewriter is often used to suggest an old-fashioned or industrial image.  It was originally released in cold type (photocomposition) before being released digitally. Like many ITC fonts, it has a range of four weights from light to bold (with matching italics) and separate condensed styles. Some releases do not have italics.

In the history of typewriters, early typewriters were initially thought to be replacements for printing and so featured proportional fonts. Monospaced typefaces, those designed so every letter takes up the same amount of space, were a more practical alternative and soon replaced printing types.

American Typewriter was by no means the first typeface to imitate typewriting.  Foundry catalogs of the late nineteenth century were already offering them, and press manufacturers even made press-size ribbons so that letters looking as if they had been typed could be produced wholesale.

In the original release, the A faces are identical to the regular ones, except for alternate versions of the following characters: &, $, R, e.

Used in media
From the 1983–84 season to the 1988–89 season, MotorWeek used the font for road tests, as well as the closing credits. Another prominent example is the CBS sitcom Young Sheldon, which uses it in its opening and closing credits, as well as its logo, and is it also used by Chuck Lorre in his vanity cards. It is also used in the famous I Love New York  logo.

The U.S. TV series The Office uses the font as its main logo, as does the U.S. TV series Psych (using the bold variant).

Tesco used the font for in-store signage between the late 1970s and mid-1990s.

Sony Ericsson used the font for branding between mid 2000's and early 2010's

Office supplies retailer OfficeMax uses the font for its logo.

macOS and iOS include the font (without italics), and some applications use it.

Clifford the Big Red Dog uses this font in book titles since the early 1980's.

The current TVOntario logo uses this font.

See also
 Courier (typeface)

References

External links

Typefaces and fonts introduced in 1974
Photocomposition typefaces
Digital typefaces
Slab serif typefaces
International Typeface Corporation typefaces